Anaxipha exigua is a cricket in the genus Anaxipha ("brown trigs"), in the subfamily Trigonidiinae ("winged bush crickets, trigs"). Common names are "Say's trig" and "Say's bush cricket".
The distribution range of Anaxipha exigua includes the Caribbean and North America.

References

Further reading
 
 Field Guide To Grasshoppers, Katydids, And Crickets Of The United States, Capinera, Scott, Walker. 2004. Cornell University Press.
 Otte, Daniel (1994). Crickets (Grylloidea). Orthoptera Species File 1, 120.

External links
NCBI Taxonomy Browser, Anaxipha exigua

Trigonidiinae
Insects described in 1825